Libous is a surname. Notable people with the surname include:

Al Libous (1928–2016), American politician 
Thomas W. Libous (1953–2016), American politician